The 2011–12 season is the 100th season in RNK Split’s history and their second in the Prva HNL. Their 3rd place finish in the 2010–11 season means it is their 2nd successive season playing in the Prva HNL.

First-team squad

Competitions

Overall

Prva HNL

Classification

Results summary

Results by round

Matches

Pre-season

Prva HNL

Europa League

Croatian Cup

Split-Dalmatia County Cup

Mid-season

Sources: Prva-HNL.hr, Sportnet.hr

Player seasonal records
Competitive matches only. Updated to games played 12 May 2012.

Top scorers

Source: Competitive matches

Disciplinary record
Includes all competitive matches. Players with 1 card or more included only.

Sources: Prva-HNL.hr, UEFA.com

Appearances and goals

Sources: Prva-HNL.hr, UEFA.com

Transfers

In

Out

Sources: nogometni-magazin.com

References

2011-12
Croatian football clubs 2011–12 season
Split